New American Music Union was a two-day summer music festival scheduled on August 8 and 9, 2008, at the SouthSide Works in Pittsburgh, Pennsylvania. Lineups on two different stages were curated by Anthony Kiedis of the Red Hot Chili Peppers.  It featured established music acts along with college bands vying for a recording contract. The show was presented by American Eagle Outfitters and co-produced by Live Nation. It was designed to be a Pittsburgh version of Milwaukee's Summerfest and Seattle's Bumbershoot.

Scott Mervis of the Pittsburgh Post-Gazette reviewed the Gnarls Barkley performance favorably, while criticizing Bob Dylan's set list choices.  Mervis' review resulted in several contrary letters to the editor.

The festival, which had been planned as an annual event, did not return for a second year because American Eagle Outfitters had moved away from using music as a marketing tool.

College band competition 
The college bands on the second stage were judged by a panel including industry and media professionals as well as other musicians. The winner received a full-day recording session in a recording studio in Los Angeles and promotion by American Eagle. The Black Fortys from Southern Illinois University were announced the winners of the best college band by Anthony Kiedis on Saturday August 9.

Main Stage Performers 

 Bob Dylan and His Band
 The Raconteurs
 The Roots
 Gnarls Barkley
 Spoon
 The Black Keys
 Tiny Masters of Today
 N.A.S.A.
 Black Mountain (band)
 The Duke Spirit

College Stage Performers 
 Gospel Gossip
 Bears
 Math the Band
 The Black Fortys
 Nothing Unexpected
 Magic Bullets
 The Delicious
 Elizabethan Report
 The Depreciation Guild
 Royal Bangs
 My Dear Disco
 The Steps
 The Flying Machines
 French Horn Rebellion
 The Company Kang

References 

Music of Pittsburgh
Festivals in Pittsburgh
Music festivals in Pennsylvania